The arrondissement of Saverne is an arrondissement of France in the Bas-Rhin department in the Grand Est region. It has 162 communes.

Composition

The communes of the arrondissement of Saverne are:

Adamswiller
Alteckendorf
Altenheim
Altwiller
Asswiller
Baerendorf
Berg
Berstett
Bettwiller
Bischholtz
Bissert
Bosselshausen
Bossendorf
Bouxwiller
Burbach
Bust
Buswiller
Butten
Dehlingen
Dettwiller
Diedendorf
Diemeringen
Dimbsthal
Dingsheim
Domfessel
Dossenheim-Kochersberg
Dossenheim-sur-Zinsel
Drulingen
Duntzenheim
Durningen
Durstel
Eckartswiller
Erckartswiller
Ernolsheim-lès-Saverne
Eschbourg
Eschwiller
Ettendorf
Eywiller
Fessenheim-le-Bas
Friedolsheim
Frohmuhl
Furchhausen
Furdenheim
Geiswiller-Zœbersdorf
Gœrlingen
Gottenhouse
Gottesheim
Gougenheim
Grassendorf
Griesheim-sur-Souffel
Gungwiller
Haegen
Handschuheim
Harskirchen
Hattmatt
Hengwiller
Herbitzheim
Hinsbourg
Hinsingen
Hirschland
Hochfelden
Hohfrankenheim
Hurtigheim
Ingenheim
Ingwiller
Issenhausen
Ittenheim
Keskastel
Kienheim
Kirrberg
Kirrwiller
Kleingœft
Kuttolsheim
Landersheim
Lichtenberg
Littenheim
Lixhausen
Lochwiller
Lohr
Lorentzen
Lupstein
Mackwiller
Maennolsheim
Marmoutier
Melsheim
Menchhoffen
Minversheim
Monswiller
Mulhausen
Mutzenhouse
Neugartheim-Ittlenheim
Neuwiller-lès-Saverne
Niedersoultzbach
Obermodern-Zutzendorf
Obersoultzbach
Oermingen
Ottersthal
Otterswiller
Ottwiller
Petersbach
La Petite-Pierre
Pfalzweyer
Pfulgriesheim
Printzheim
Puberg
Quatzenheim
Ratzwiller
Rauwiller
Reinhardsmunster
Reipertswiller
Reutenbourg
Rexingen
Rimsdorf
Ringendorf
Rohr
Rosteig
Saessolsheim
Saint-Jean-Saverne
Sarre-Union
Sarrewerden
Saverne
Schalkendorf
Scherlenheim
Schillersdorf
Schnersheim
Schœnbourg
Schopperten
Schwenheim
Schwindratzheim
Siewiller
Siltzheim
Sommerau
Sparsbach
Steinbourg
Struth
Stutzheim-Offenheim
Thal-Drulingen
Thal-Marmoutier
Tieffenbach
Truchtersheim
Uttwiller
Vœllerdingen
Volksberg
Waldhambach
Waldolwisheim
Waltenheim-sur-Zorn
Weinbourg
Weislingen
Weiterswiller
Westhouse-Marmoutier
Weyer
Wickersheim-Wilshausen
Willgottheim
Wilwisheim
Wimmenau
Wingen-sur-Moder
Wingersheim-les-Quatre-Bans
Wintzenheim-Kochersberg
Wiwersheim
Wolfskirchen
Wolschheim
Zittersheim

History

The arrondissement of Saverne was created in 1800, disbanded in 1871 (ceded to Germany) and restored in 1919. In January 2015 it gained 53 communes from the former arrondissement of Strasbourg-Campagne, and it lost two communes to the new arrondissement of Haguenau-Wissembourg and seven communes to the arrondissement of Molsheim.

As a result of the reorganisation of the cantons of France which came into effect in 2015, the borders of the cantons are no longer related to the borders of the arrondissements. The cantons of the arrondissement of Saverne were, as of January 2015:

 Bouxwiller
 Drulingen
 Marmoutier
 La Petite-Pierre
 Sarre-Union
 Saverne

References

Saverne